Werder Bremen is a successful football club based in the Free Hanseatic City of Bremen, northern Germany which participated in UEFA competitions on many occasions in the past. They won the UEFA Cup Winners' Cup in 1992 and the UEFA Intertoto Cup in 1998. They were runners-up of the UEFA Cup in 2008–09 before it was rebranded as the UEFA Europa League (or UEL for short). They were also runners-up of the 1993 European Super Cup.

Currently, they still play in Bundesliga as of 2023. Nonetheless, they haven't been playing in any UEFA-organised competition since the 2010–11 season, when they last competed in UEFA Champions League, reaching the group stage respectively.

Overall statistics in UEFA competitions

UEFA record 

In the table below are depicted SV Werder Bremen's historical results in European football by UEFA competition, according to their competitive history in the passing of time.

Notes

References 

SV Werder Bremen
German football clubs in international competitions